"All Torn Down" is a song by Australian punk rock band The Living End. It was released in December 1998, as the third single from their self-titled album. It spent 18 weeks in the Australian ARIA Singles Chart and peaked at No. 12.

The song has a fast tempo of 133 beats per minute.

Background
The song title and lyrics refer to the rapid development of Melbourne in the late 1990s, with major projects such as CityLink and Melbourne Docklands in progress and being constructed with little regard to whether it was development on parks or historic sites. The cover art depicts a redscale Melway map of the Melbourne CBD and Southbank area..

Track listing

Charts

End of Year Charts

Certifications

Release history

Personnel
Band members
Chris Cheney – vocals, guitar
Travis Demsey – drums, backing vocals
Scott Owen – double bass, backing vocals

Recording process
 Producer – Lindsay Gravina ("All Torn Down" & "Witch Doctor")
 Engineer – Lindsay Gravina ("All Torn Down" & "Witch Doctor")
 Assistant engineer – Matt Voight ("All Torn Down" & "Witch Doctor")
 Mastering – Stephen Marcussen at Precision Mastering
 Mixing – Jerry Finn ("All Torn Down" & "Witch Doctor")
 Assistant mixer – Mark and Tony ("All Torn Down" & "Witch Doctor")
 Editing (digital) – Don C. Tyler
 Studios – Sing Sing Studios, Melbourne ("All Torn Down" & "Witch Doctor"); Q Recordings ("Tainted Love")
Mixing studios – Conway Studios, Los Angeles

Art works
 Cover art – Craig Preston

References

1998 singles
Songs about cities
The Living End songs
1998 songs
Modular Recordings singles
Songs written by Chris Cheney
Songs written by Travis Demsey
EMI Records singles
Songs about Australia